Wergeland can refer to members of a notable Norwegian family:
Agnes Mathilde Wergeland - Norwegian-American historian
Camilla (Wergeland) Collett - Norwegian feminist writer, sister of Henrik Wergeland
Harald Wergeland - Norwegian physicist
Harald Nicolai Storm Wergeland - Norwegian military officer, and politician
Henrik Wergeland - Norwegian writer, playwright, historian and linguist
Joseph Frantz Oscar Wergeland - Norwegian military officer, brother of Henrik Wergeland
Nicolai Wergeland - Norwegian priest, writer and politician
Oscar Wergeland - Norwegian painter

See also
Wergeland Township, Minnesota in Yellow Medicine County, United States